Gercebahşiş is a village in Anamur district of Mersin Province, Turkey. It is at the north east of Anamur.
The population of the village is 1496  as of 2011.

References

Villages in Anamur District